Joseph Simeone (October 8, 1921 – May 1, 2015) was judge on the Supreme Court of Missouri from 1978 until 1979.  Previously, Judge Simeone was the Chief Judge of the Missouri Court of Appeals for the Eastern District.  Shortly after his appointment to the Supreme Court of Missouri, he was appointed to a position within the Social Security Administration, as an Administrative Law Judge.

Education
B.S., Saint Louis University
LL.B., Washington University in St. Louis School of Law
LL.M., University of Michigan Law School
S.J.D., University of Michigan Law School

Sources

1921 births
2015 deaths
Judges of the Supreme Court of Missouri
Missouri Court of Appeals judges
University of Michigan Law School alumni
Washington University in St. Louis faculty
Washington University School of Law alumni
People from Quincy, Illinois